The Autonomist Party of Corrientes is a liberal provincial political party in Corrientes Province, Argentina.

History
It is the claimed successor of the National Autonomist Party in the Province of Corrientes.

References 

Provincial political parties in Argentina